Medialuna is a genus of sea chubs native to the eastern Pacific Ocean.

Species
There are currently two recognized species in this genus:
 Medialuna ancietae Chirichigno F., 1987
 Medialuna californiensis (Steindachner, 1876) (Halfmoon)

References

Kyphosidae

Ray-finned fish genera